Reinold is a surname. Notable people with the surname include:

Arnold William Reinold (1843–1921), English physicist
Bernard A. Reinold (1860–1940), American stage actor
Dominic Reinold (1989), German former professional footballer
Elina Reinold (1971), Estonian actress

Surnames from given names